Fabian Lukas Schär (born 20 December 1991) is a Swiss professional footballer who currently plays as a centre-back for Premier League club Newcastle United and the Switzerland national team.

Beginning his career at his hometown club of Wil, Schär transferred to Basel in 2012, winning the Swiss Super League in all three of his seasons before his move to Hoffenheim.

After playing at the 2012 Olympics, Schär made his senior debut for Switzerland in 2013. He represented the nation at the FIFA World Cup in 2014, 2018 and 2022, as well as the UEFA European Championship in 2016 and 2020.

Club career

Wil
Born in Wil, Canton of St. Gallen, Schär began his playing career at hometown club Wil and rose through the youth ranks, soon playing regularly for Wil's reserve team. He eventually made his league debut on 29 November 2009 against FC Stade Nyonnais, coming on as a late substitute. He scored his first Swiss Challenge League goal in an away win against Yverdon-Sport on 30 October 2010.

Basel
On 4 July 2012, Schär transferred to Basel on a three-year contract with the option of a fourth. He made his Swiss Super League debut on 29 September in a 1–1 away draw against Lausanne-Sport. He scored his first goal for his new club on 7 October in the St. Jakob-Park during the 3–2 home win against Servette, heading an equaliser following a corner from Fabian Frei.

At the end of the Swiss Super League season 2012–13 Schär won the Championship title and was Swiss Cup runner up with Basel. In the 2012–13 UEFA Europa League Basel advanced as far as the semi-finals, there being matched against the reigning UEFA Champions League holders Chelsea, but they were knocked out losing both matches and being beaten 2–5 on aggregate.

At the end of the 2013–14 Super League season Schär won his second league championship with Basel. They also reached the final of the 2013–14 Swiss Cup, but were beaten 2–0 by Zürich after extra time. During the 2013–14 Champions League season Basel reached the group stage and finished the group in third position. Thus they qualified for Europa League knockout phase and here they advanced as far as the quarter-finals.

The 2014–15 season was a very successful one for Basel and Schär. Basel won the championship for the sixth time in a row that season. In the 2014–15 Swiss Cup they reached the final, but for the third season in a row, they finished as runners-up, losing 0–3 to Sion in the final. Basel entered the Champions League in the group stage and reached the knockout stages, with a 1–1 away draw against Liverpool enough to take them through. Basel later lost to Porto in the Round of 16.

Hoffenheim
On 4 June 2015, Schär signed for Hoffenheim.

Deportivo La Coruña
On 21 July 2017, Schär signed a four-year deal with Deportivo de La Coruña. He made his La Liga debut on 20 August, starting in a 3–0 home loss against Real Madrid. He scored two goals in the 2017–18 season, which ended in relegation for the Galician team.

Newcastle United

On 26 July 2018, following Deportivo de La Coruña's relegation from the La Liga, Schär signed a three-year deal with Newcastle United after the club had activated his £3 million buy out clause in his contract.

He made his debut for the club on 26 August 2018 in a 2–1 defeat to Chelsea. Schär scored his first goals for Newcastle against Cardiff City on 19 January 2019, netting twice in a 3–0 victory at St James' Park. He scored his third Newcastle goal against Burnley in a 2–0 win, opening the scoring with a 30-yard strike that would win Premier League and Match of the Day's February Goal of the Month competition. His fourth goal came in the final game of the season, and eventual 4–0 win over Fulham.

International career

Schär was a Switzerland youth international having played at under-20 and under-21 level. Schär made his international debut for the Swiss U-20 team in a game against Poland U-20 on 17 November 2011. He played his first game for the Swiss U-21 on 29 February 2012 in the 2–1 defeat against the Austrian U-21. He scored his first goal for the Swiss U-21 during his fourth appearance for them on 10 September 2012 in a match against Estonia U-21 This was the final game in the qualification to the 2013 UEFA European Under-21 Football Championship. Switzerland finished in second position and entered the play-offs. In the first leg of the qualification play-offs on 12 October 2012 against the German U-21 team Schär was shown the red card after he fouled Sebastian Polter as last man. Despite the goal from the penalty spot the game ended in a 1–1 draw.

He was selected to represent Switzerland in the men's football tournament at the 2012 Summer Olympics as part of the Swiss under-23 team. He played over 90 minutes in the first two games of the tournament, but the team were knocked out, finishing in fourth position of their Group.

On 8 August 2013, Schär was called up to Swiss senior team for the first time and made his debut on the friendly match vs Brazil on 14 August 2013.

On 6 September 2013, scored his first goal for the Swiss senior team in a 4–4 home draw against Iceland. Four days later, on 10 September, Schär scored two more goals in a 2–0 away win over Norway.

On 13 May 2014, Schär was named in Switzerland's squad for the 2014 World Cup. He made his tournament debut as a starter in the team's third match, replacing the injured Steve von Bergen and helping Switzerland to a clean sheet in a 3–0 defeat of Honduras.

In Switzerland's first game of Euro 2016, Schär headed Xherdan Shaqiri's corner kick after five minutes for the only goal against Albania in Lens.

He was included in the Swiss team 23-man squad for the 2018 World Cup.

In May 2019, he was named to the national team for the 2018-19 UEFA Nations League final matches and played in all two matches but finished 4th.

In 2021, he was called up to the national team for the 2020 UEFA European Championship, where the team created one of the main sensations of the tournament reaching the quarter-finals.

Career statistics

Club

International

As of match played 5 September 2019. Switzerland score listed first, score column indicates score after each Schär goal.

Honours
Basel
Swiss Super League: 2012–13, 2013–14, 2014–15
Uhren Cup: 2013

Newcastle United
EFL Cup runner-up: 2022–23

Individual
Premier League Goal of the Month: February 2019
North-East FWA Player of the Year: 2019

References

External links

1991 births
Living people
People from Wil
Association football defenders
Swiss men's footballers
Switzerland youth international footballers
Switzerland under-21 international footballers
Olympic footballers of Switzerland
Switzerland international footballers
FC Wil players
FC Basel players
TSG 1899 Hoffenheim players
Deportivo de La Coruña players
Newcastle United F.C. players
Swiss Super League players
Swiss Challenge League players
Bundesliga players
La Liga players
Premier League players
Footballers at the 2012 Summer Olympics
2014 FIFA World Cup players
UEFA Euro 2016 players
2018 FIFA World Cup players
UEFA Euro 2020 players
2022 FIFA World Cup players
Swiss expatriate footballers
Swiss expatriate sportspeople in Germany
Expatriate footballers in Germany
Swiss expatriate sportspeople in Spain
Expatriate footballers in Spain
Swiss expatriate sportspeople in England
Expatriate footballers in England
Sportspeople from the canton of St. Gallen